

Vincent Callebaut Bio 

Vincent Callebaut (born May 27, 1977) is a Belgian ecological architect. He designs futuristic-like ecodistrict projects which take account of several aspects of sustainability (renewable energies, biodiversity, and urban agriculture).

Biography

Vincent Callebaut was born in 1977 in Belgium. He graduated in 2000 from the Institute Victor Horta and moved to Paris for internship with architects Odile Decq and Massimiliano Fuksas. He then founded his own company called Vincent Callebaut Architectures.

Virtual projects

Dragonfly

The Dragonfly project is a design project which urges the implementation of mixed use "vertical farm" towers in Manhattan, located at the South edge of Roosevelt Island along the East River. In the towers, traditional commercial and residential space would exist alongside vast vertical farms that would serve as community gardens, allowing local residents to grow their own fresh produce. The vision of the project is to allow one to be 'eating an apple that just got picked out of a collective orchard in the fourth floor while looking at New York City through the window and then back to your office just in the upper floor.' The concept behind the project was inspired by the Japanese movie "Laputa: Castle in the Sky".

The centre of the towers would not be occupied by residential and commercial space, but rather open to a large 'bio-climatic' vertical garden. Residential and commercial space in the towers would be organized along the periphery of each 'wing', so as to create a frame that the vertical garden will stretch in between. The vertical garden will be glassed-in, giving the impression of two crystalline wings made out of glass and steel. The glass panels of the garden would be in a honeycomb pattern to allow the most sunlight to pass through the building. The Dragonfly project as a concept is seen as a feeder farm meant to reconnect urban consumers with food producers. Each tower would be a massive urban farm complex, superimposing garden space for the production of vegetables, fields, production of meat, milk, poultry, and eggs over 132 floors, extending  vertically. The Dragonfly towers are designed to accommodate 28 different agricultural fields for production, and to ideally be self-sufficient. Bio-fertilizing would be powered by sun shield and eolian systems, as energy would be sourced from combined solar and wind power, and water would be recycled within the building.
Every resource would be recycled in a continuous auto-feeding loop so that nothing is lost. The spaces between the wings are designed to take advantage of solar energy by accumulating warm air in the structure during winter. During the summer, the space would be similarly cooled through natural ventilation, and "evapo-perspiration" from the plants.

The objectives of the Dragonfly project were defined as:
Creating proximity between the Manhattan inhabitants and food productions,
Reducing intermediaries in the production model,
Getting close to self-sufficiency which leads to financial savings.

Lilypad

The Lilypad or the Floating ecopolis project is based on the idea of creating a place for future refugees of current sea level rise caused by global warming.

Built or under construction

Tao Zhu Yin Yuan 

Formerly called "Agora Garden", Vincent Callebaut designed a tower for Taipei, promoting vertical construction in an overpopulated city. It is a concept of eco-construction to reduce the carbon footprint of its inhabitants.

Vincent Callebaut Architectures SARL replied to an invitation to tender in November 2010. In 2014, the project was under construction, and was completed in 2018.

The shape of the building looks like a molecule of DNA with its double helix (but in the opposite chirality of most common (known) B-form DNA). This was designed to represent a symbol of life and dynamism.

The aim of the project is to represent a perfect symbiosis between humans and nature. Vincent Callebaut aims to develop an avant-gardist architecture and tries to institute a new lifestyle in harmony with nature. The building is intended to guarantee environmental norms in order to obtain the Green Building Label delivered by the Home Affairs Ministry of Taipei.

The project addresses four ecologic objectives of the Copenhagen Accord:

 Reduction of global warming,
 Protection of biodiversity,
 Protection of the environment and quality of life,
 Management of natural resources and waste.

The Agora Garden concept embraces the Cradle to Cradle philosophy: "nothing is lost and everything transforms itself" (Antoine Lavoisier). All materials are recycled or recyclable in order to imitate the processes of natural ecosystems. For example, at the top, there is a huge free access garden covered by photovoltaic panels that produce electricity for the building. The tower is surrounded by  trees which increase the biodiversity in the city.

Agora Garden was planned as twenty levels in a double helix formation, with a total twist from bottom to the top of ninety degrees. The twist satisfies four major objectives. Firstly, thanks to this architecture, the morphology of the building change according to its orientation: On the East/West side we can see a rhomboidal pyramid, when on the north–south side we can see a reverse pyramid. Then, all flats have their own balconies looking like a hanging garden. Thirdly, there is no vis-à-vis so inhabitants have privacy and a panoramic view of Taipei. 

The six main components of the project are:
 The forestair: the building is bordered by a forest which ensures the privacy of the inhabitants. The light is over present and the car parks, the swimming pool, and the fitness area are naturally ventilated.
 Indoor and outdoor areas are well-connected credit to all the bay windows.
 The central core is composed of two staircases, four high-speed elevators, a car elevator, and two sky garages.
 The apartments measure . This may seem large for European people but in Taiwan, it is not uncommon for large families of three generations to live together in one flat.
 The landscape balconies project is to build gardens which cover the entire building and, in this way, reintroduce an element of nature to the city. Inhabitants can cultivate fruits, vegetables, and herbs so that they could be self-sufficient. Therefore, these gardens take part in the sustainability process. There are compost spaces to transform waste into organic fertilizers, and reservoirs to collect rainwater.

The Gate 

The Gate Heliopolis is under construction in Cairo, Egypt. It is a multi-use complex of 450,000 square metres (4,843,759.69 sq feet) with housing, workspaces, and facilities like sports. The rooftop is a garden where you can swim, run, and/or hide.

References

Belgian architects
Sustainable building in Europe
1977 births
Living people